Ismel Jiménez Santiago (born February 10, 1986) is a Cuban baseball pitcher. He plays for Sancti Spíritus of the Cuban National Series.

Career
Jiménez has pitched for the Cuba national baseball team in the 2009 World Baseball Classic (WBC), 2011 Pan American Games, 2013 World Port Tournament, 2013 WBC, and 2015 Pan American Games.

In 2015, Jiménez played for the Québec Capitales for the Canadian American Association of Professional Baseball.

References

External links

Living people
1986 births
Cuban baseball players
Baseball pitchers
2009 World Baseball Classic players
2013 World Baseball Classic players
Québec Capitales players
People from Trinidad, Cuba
Pan American Games medalists in baseball
Pan American Games bronze medalists for Cuba
Baseball players at the 2015 Pan American Games
Medalists at the 2015 Pan American Games